The General Board (in full, the General Board of the United States Navy) was an advisory body to the U.S. Navy between 1900 and 1951.

General Board may also refer to:
General Board of Health, nineteenth-century UK local government body
General board (Dutch water boards), Netherlands water administrative body
General Board of the Y.M.M.I.A., youth administrative body within the Church of Jesus Christ of Latter-day Saints
Within the United Methodist Church:
General Board of Church and Society
General Board of Discipleship
General Board of Pension and Health Benefits

See also
Board of directors